Bulbus fritillariae cirrhosae is the bulb of the Himalayan frillitary lily (Fritillaria cirrhosa). It is used extensively in Chinese herbology. For example, in the Baihe Gujin Wan, it is used to "nourish yin of the lung, resolve phlegm and relieve cough".

References

Plants used in traditional Chinese medicine